Maikel van der Vleuten (born 10 February 1988) is a Dutch show jumping rider. He was born in Geldrop. He competed at the 2012 Summer Olympics in London, where he won a silver medal in team jumping and finished 37th in the individual.

As of May 2020, he is ranked as the #15 rider in the world. He has previously been ranked as high as #5 in the world.

Early life 
Maikel van der Vleuten was born on 10 February 1988 in Geldrop, the Netherlands. His father, Eric, is a successful show jumper himself, and Maikel and his brother, Eric Jr., grew up with horses. Maikel began riding at the age of 6 and starting competing internationally at the age of 13 in the pony divisions. He competed in his first championship as a junior rider in 2004, and in 2005 he won team gold with Nobel at the FEI European Junior Championship. In the years 2006–2009, van der Vleuten competed in the FEI Young Rider Championships each year, taking home a team silver and a team bronze, and finishing fifth individually three of the four years.

Professional career 
Van der Vleuten began competing at the senior level in 2010, jumping his first 5* competition at Rotterdam (NEL). He jumped at his first senior championship the following year, competing for the Netherlands at the 2011 European Championships in Madrid (ESP) where the team finished fourth. In 2012, van der Vleuten was selected for the Dutch team to compete at the London Olympic Games with Verdi TN, where the team won the silver medal. Two years later, Verdi TN and van der Vleuten won the gold medal with the Dutch team at the 2014 World Equestrian Games in Normandy (FRA). They were also 6th at the FEI World Cup Finals in Lyon (FRA) and won the FEI Nations Cup Final in Barcelona (ESP).

Van der Vleuten continued to his international success, winning team gold at the 2015 European Championships, and recording another 6th-place finish at the FEI World Cup Jumping Finals, this time in Las Vegas, NV (USA). Verdi TN and van der Vleuten competed at the 2016 Olympic Games in Rio de Janeiro where they finished 20th individually. Although van der Vleuten had other horses in his string, he used Verdi TN at nearly every championship until Verdi's retirement in March 2020.

Van der Vleuten and his father, Eric, are sponsored by the VDL Groep, an international company that is involved in manufacturing and subcontracting, as well as Massimo Dutti. The duo also is part of the Madrid in Motion Global Champions League team, alongside Eduardo Alvarez Aznar, Mark McAuley, Cindy van der Straten, and Michael G Duffy.

54eme CHI de Genève - 20141212 - Maikel Van der Vleuten et Verdi 11.jpg

Results

References

External links
 

1988 births
Living people
People from Geldrop
Sportspeople from North Brabant
Dutch show jumping riders
Olympic equestrians of the Netherlands
Dutch male equestrians
Equestrians at the 2012 Summer Olympics
Equestrians at the 2016 Summer Olympics
Equestrians at the 2020 Summer Olympics
Olympic silver medalists for the Netherlands
Olympic bronze medalists for the Netherlands
Olympic medalists in equestrian
Medalists at the 2012 Summer Olympics
Medalists at the 2020 Summer Olympics
21st-century Dutch people